Saur may refer to:
 Saur (company) a French utility company
 Saur (restaurant), Michelin starred restaurant in The Hague, Netherlands
 Dog king - a Scandinavian tradition
 Saur 1 - an APC developed by ROMARM
 K. G. Saur Verlag, German publisher
Saur Revolution, 1978 event in Afghanistan
 "-saur", a suffix used in taxonomy to describe reptiles, particularly dinosaurs

Places
 Saur, Iran, a village in South Khorasan Province, Iran
 Saur Mountains, in China and Kazakhstan
Saur Bazar,  a block in Saharsa, Bihar, India
Saur Valley, a valley in Uttarakhand, India

People with the surname
 Karl Saur (1902–1966), German State Secretary and founder of publishing house

See also
Saurs (disambiguation)